Avdan is a Turkish place name that may refer to the following places in Turkey:

 Avdan, Bozkurt
 Avdan, Bolu, a village in the district of Bolu, Bolu Province
 Avdan, Çamlıdere, a village in the district of Çamlıdere, Ankara Province
 Avdan, Dinar, a village in the district of Dinar, Afyonkarahisar Province
 Avdan, Emirdağ, a village in the district of Emirdağ, Afyonkarahisar Province
 Avdan, Keles
 Avdan, Korkuteli, a village in the district of Korkuteli, Antalya Province
 Avdan, Osmaneli, a village in the district of Osmaneli, Bilecik Province
 Avdan, Tavas
 Avdan, Vezirköprü, a village in the district of Vezirköprü, Samsun Province